The 1990 Vermont gubernatorial election took place on November 6, 1990. Incumbent Democratic Governor Madeleine Kunin did not seek re-election.  Former Governor of Vermont, Republican Richard Snelling defeated Democratic former State Senate President pro tempore Peter Welch in the general election. This would be the last Republican victory in a Vermont gubernatorial election until 2002.

Democratic primary

Candidates
 Peter Welch, former State Senate President pro tempore and candidate for the U.S. House in 1988
 William Gwin

Results

Republican primary

Candidates
 Richard Snelling, former Governor and nominee for the U.S. Senate in 1986
 Richard F. Gottlieb, perennial candidate

Results

Libertarian primary

Candidates
 David Atkinson

Results

General election

Results

References

See also
 1990 United States gubernatorial elections

1990
Gubernatorial
1990 United States gubernatorial elections